Craigendoran railway station is a railway station serving Craigendoran, east of Helensburgh, Scotland. West Highland Line trains used to call here but no longer do following the closure of the upper platforms.

History 

Opened by the North British Railway on 15 May 1882, at one time the station had five platforms: two as an island platform on the West Highland Line - sometimes called Craigendoran Upper (closed in 1964 and subsequently demolished), one on Craigendoran Pier serving Clyde Steamers (closed in 1972 and lifted) and two on the line to Helensburgh (one closed when the line was singled). All five platforms, bar those for the West Highland Line, were electrified. There were once goods sidings located in here, built in the 1940s, but these were removed in 1964 with the end of regular local freight workings.

The track layout at Craigendoran Junction was simplified in 1984 under the auspices of British Rail, singling the line to Helensburgh Central. The line south of here towards  remains double track.

Facilities 
The station is equipped with a shelter (which is accessed by some steps), a bench and bike racks, as well as a car park, accessed over the footbridge. The only step-free access to the station is from Dennistoun Crescent. As there are no facilities to purchase tickets, passengers must buy one in advance, or from the guard on the train.

Passenger volume 

The statistics cover twelve month periods that start in April.

Services 
On weekdays & Saturdays, there is a typically half-hourly service westbound to Helensburgh Central, and eastbound to Edinburgh Waverley, via Glasgow Queen Street low-level and Airdrie, which skips stations between Dalmuir and Hyndland. On Sundays, the service remains half-hourly, but trains serve all stations via .

References

Bibliography

External Links 

 Video footage of the station on YouTube

Railway stations in Argyll and Bute
Former North British Railway stations
Railway stations in Great Britain opened in 1882
Railway stations in Great Britain opened in 1894 
Railway stations in Great Britain closed in 1964 
SPT railway stations
Railway stations served by ScotRail
James Miller railway stations